Didrik Marksten (born 1 March 1971) is a Norwegian alpine skier. He was born in Oslo, and represented the club IF Ready. He competed at the 1992 Winter Olympics in Albertville.

References

External links

1971 births
Living people
Alpine skiers from Oslo
Norwegian male alpine skiers
Olympic alpine skiers of Norway
Alpine skiers at the 1992 Winter Olympics